Punds Water is a freshwater loch near Mangaster in Northmavine, Shetland. It also gives its name to a nearby Neolithic heel-shaped cairn.

Heel-shaped cairn
From front to back the cairn measures . Within the facade is the entrance to a passage leading to a trefoil-shaped burial chamber.

References

Further reading 
 
 Henshall, A S. (1963a) The chambered tombs of Scotland, vol. 1. Edinburgh. Page(s): 172 ZET 33 RCAHMS Shelf Number: E.7.1.HEN
 MacKie, E W. (1975a) Scotland: an archaeological guide: from the earliest times to the twelfth century. London. Page(s): 284 RCAHMS Shelf Number: E.2.MAC
 RCAHMS. (1946) The Royal Commission on the Ancient and Historical Monuments of Scotland. Twelfth report with an inventory of the ancient monuments of Orkney and Shetland, 3v. Edinburgh. Page(s): 96 No.1367 RCAHMS Shelf Number: A.1.1.INV/12
 Ritchie, A. (1985a) Exploring Scotland's heritage: Orkney and Shetland, Exploring Scotland's heritage series. Edinburgh. Page(s): 166-7 No.103 RCAHMS Shelf Number: A.1.4.HER
 Ritchie, A. (1997b) Shetland, Exploring Scotland's Heritage series. 2nd. Edinburgh. Page(s): 134-5 No. 69 RCAHMS Shelf Number: A.1.4.HER

Chambered cairns in Scotland
Mainland, Shetland
Archaeological sites in Shetland
Neolithic Scotland
Northmavine